Shaggy may refer to:

People
Shaggy (musician) (born 1968), Jamaican American reggae rapper and singer
Shaggy 2 Dope, half of the hip hop, horrorcore band Insane Clown Posse
Shaggy Flores (born 1973), Nuyorican poet, writer and African diaspora scholar
José Joaquín Martínez (born 1987), Mexican soccer player nicknamed "Shaggy" after Shaggy Rogers

Other uses
Shaggy Rogers, a fictional character in the Scooby-Doo series
Shaggy (film), a 1948 American drama
Shaggy Ridge, a ridge in the Finisterre Range, in north eastern Papua New Guinea

See also
Shag (disambiguation)